Diane Bell (born 11 October 1963) is a British former judoka. She won the 56–61 kg event at the 1988 Summer Olympics in Seoul, but at the time women's judo was then still a demonstration sport, so unlike the men Bell did not enter the list of Olympic medalists in judo. She also won two World Judo Championships, a Commonwealth Games gold and three European Judo Championships.

Judo career
Bell won the World Judo Championships in 1986 and 1987, and the European Championships in 1984, 1986 and 1988. Bell is Britain's most successful judoka at the European Judo Championships. In total, she has won 3 gold medals, 3 silver medals and 5 bronze medals. In 1986, she won the 56–61 kg event at the 1986 Commonwealth Games; the event was a demonstration sport.

In 1988, she won the 56–61 kg event at the 1988 Summer Olympics; judo was a demonstration sport at the Games. Bell represented England at the 1990 Commonwealth Games in Auckland, New Zealand, and won a gold medal in the 61kg half-middleweight. Bell beat New Zealander Donna Guy-Halkyard in the final. Bell also competed at the 1992 and 1996 Summer Olympics.

In addition to her international titles, she is a four times champion of Great Britain, winning the lightweight division at the British Judo Championships in 1982 and 1983 and the light-middleweight division in 1992 and 1994.

Coaching
In 1997, Bell took up coaching. At the 2000 Summer Olympics in Sydney, Bell cut Deborah Allan's hair on the weighing scales after Allan was found to be  over the weight limit for her event.

References

External links
 

1963 births
British female judoka
Judoka at the 1992 Summer Olympics
Judoka at the 1996 Summer Olympics
British sports coaches
Living people
Goodwill Games medalists in judo
Commonwealth Games medallists in judo
Commonwealth Games gold medallists for England
Olympic judoka of Great Britain
Judoka at the 1990 Commonwealth Games
Competitors at the 1990 Goodwill Games
Medallists at the 1990 Commonwealth Games